Diaethria neglecta is a species of butterfly of the genus Diaethria. It was described by Osbert Salvin in 1869. It is found in Bolivia, Peru, Ecuador, Colombia and Venezuela. All Diaethria species are commonly called eighty-eights because of the patterns on the hindwing undersides.

Subspecies
D. n. neglecta (Bolivia, Peru, Ecuador, Colombia)
D. n. merida (Honrath, 1884) (Venezuela)

Description

The uppersides is black, marked on the forewings with a diagonal band of metallic blue or green. The colour is repeated on the hindwings in the form of a submarginal band. The hindwing undersides pattern consists of black dots surrounded by concentric white and black lines, and looks like the number "89" or "98".

Habitats and Distribution
This common species occurs from Panama to Bolivia at elevations of 200–1700 m, in rain- and cloudforests where the larval foodplant Trema (Cannabaceae) grows.

References

Biblidinae
Butterflies described in 1869
Nymphalidae of South America
Taxa named by Osbert Salvin